The Lincoln Motion Picture Company was an American film production company founded in 1916 by Noble Johnson and George Perry Johnson. Noble Johnson was president of the company, and the secretary was actor Clarence A. Brooks. Dr. James T. Smith was treasurer, and Dudley A. Brooks was the assistant secretary. The company is known as the first producer of race movies. Established in Omaha, Nebraska, the company relocated to Los Angeles the following year. It remained in operation until 1923, closing shortly after announcing a final project, The Heart of a Negro. The point of the creation of Lincoln's was to eliminate the stereotypical roles of "slapstick comedy" in Hollywood at the time for Black actors and actresses. "best advertised and most widely known Race Corporation in the world" is the famous slogan for the company.

Background 
In the first two decades of the 20th century, African American audiences were ignored by film studios. Because African American audiences were ignored, there was a high demand for films geared to catering to black audiences. Thus bringing about the need for black motion picture production companies.

The Lincoln Motion Picture Company is considered the first all-Black movie production company, building a reputation for making films that showcased African American talent in the film industry. The company made and distributed only five films. The first film that was created and produced by the Lincoln Motion Picture Company was "The Realization of a Negro's Ambition" (1916). This was the first film that would portray and show the Black middle class. These films were limited to African American audiences in churches, schools, and "Colored Only" theaters, despite the Johnson brothers wanting a wider audience. Unfortunately, production expenses and low sales halted future films to be made and distributed. Noble left his position as president to become an actor at Universal Pictures, with Dr. James T. Smith taking over the position. Speculation tells that the films that starred Johnson were released by the company at this time were commercially more successful than the white owned Universal Studios.  The Lincoln Motion Picture Company lasted until 1921.

Although the Lincoln Motion Picture Company did not last long, it was influential in the African American community. This company inspired the movement of more ethnic movie companies.

Filmography

The Realization of a Negro's Ambition (1916) 
The Law of Nature (1916)
The Trooper of Company K (1917)
A Man's Duty (1919)
By Right of Birth (1921)

See also
 African Americans in Omaha, Nebraska
 Oscar Micheaux

Footnotes

References
Berry, S. Torriano. The 50 Most Influential Black Films: A Celebration of African-American Talent, Determination, Citadel Press, (2001) – 
Bowser, Pearl. Oscar Micheaux and His Circle: African-American Filmmaking and Race Cinema of the Silent Era, Indiana University Press, (2001) – 
Cripps, Thomas. Slow Fade to Black: The Negro in American Film, 1900-1942, Oxford University Press, (1977) - 
Jones, George William. Black Cinema Treasures: Lost and Found, University of North Texas Press, (1991) – 
Reid, Mark A. Redefining Black Film, University of California Press, (1993) – 
Sampson, Henry T. Blacks in Black and White: A Source Book on Black Films, The Scarecrow Press, Inc., New Jersey, (1997) – 
Stewart, Jacqueline. Migrating to the Movies: Cinema and Black Urban Modernity, University of California Press, (2005) – 
McClure, Michelle (2000). Black Camera - A Micro Journal of Black Film Studies. United States: Black Film Center/Archive, Indiana University. pp. 1–8.

External links

Filmography of Lincoln Motion Picture Company
Feature Presentation: Race Movies

African-American cinema
African-American history in Omaha, Nebraska
History of California
African-American cultural history
Universal Pictures
Film production companies of the United States
1916 establishments in Nebraska